Nathan "Nate" Brown (born July 7, 1991) is an American former professional road racing cyclist.

Biography
Brown was born on July 7, 1991, in Colorado Springs, Colorado, United States, but spent his adolescence in Covington, Tennessee, United States. Brown divides his time between Austin, Texas, United States and Girona, Catalonia, Spain.

He remained with the squad for the 2016 season. In June 2017, he was named in the start list for the 2017 Tour de France, making Brown the first Tennessean to compete in the Tour de France.

Major results

2006
 2nd Road race, National Junior Road Championships
2008
 1st  Overall Coupe des Nations Abitibi
1st Stage 3 (ITT)
2009
 5th Overall Trofeo Karlsberg
2010
 4th Time trial, National Under-23 Road Championships
 7th La Côte Picarde
2011
 1st  Time trial, National Under-23 Road Championships
 1st Prologue Tour de Guadeloupe
 7th Overall Coupe des nations Ville Saguenay
2012
 3rd Time trial, National Under-23 Road Championships
 4th Time trial, Pan American Road Championships
 9th Chrono Champenois
2013
 National Under-23 Road Championships
1st  Time trial
2nd Road race
 1st  Overall Tour de Beauce
1st  Points classification
 2nd Liège–Bastogne–Liège Espoirs
 3rd Time trial, National Road Championships
 9th Overall Coupe des nations Ville Saguenay
2017
 Tour de France
Held  after Stages 3–4
2019
 1st Stage 1 (TTT) Tour Colombia

Grand Tour general classification results timeline

References

External links

1991 births
Sportspeople from Tennessee
Living people
American male cyclists
People from Covington, Tennessee
Cyclists from Colorado
20th-century American people
21st-century American people